Corwen East railway station in the town of Corwen, Denbighshire, Wales, was a temporary railway station on the former Ruabon to Barmouth Line, and was, from 2014 to 2018 the western terminus of the preserved Llangollen Railway.

History
Corwen East was a station opened on 22 October 2014 as the temporary western terminus of the Llangollen Railway. This was a private service for supporters of the Corwen Appeal. The first public service trains to Corwen East ran throughout the week commencing 27 October 2014 and at weekends until 9 November 2014. These first trains were hailed a success, with nearly 4000 passengers travelling during the first ten days of trains to Corwen East.

The first public services in 2015 ran during the Llangollen Railway's Winter Warmer event on 2–3 January 2015. The first train ran using Class 104 DMU Nos.

There was a formal opening ceremony on Saint David's Day, 1 March 2015. Officials unveiled the bilingual Corwen name board "Dwyrain Corwen East", showing the station's name in both languages: Dwyrain Corwen and Corwen East.
                                          
The station was closed in November 2018 and dismantled in early 2019 and is being replaced by the new permanent station, Corwen Central, alongside the town's main car park.

Service

References

Llangollen Railway
Railway stations in Great Britain opened in 2014
Railway stations in Great Britain closed in 2018
Heritage railway stations in Denbighshire
Railway stations built for UK heritage railways
2014 establishments in Wales
Corwen
2018 disestablishments in Wales